Carlos da Motta (born 20 April 1959) is a Brazilian equestrian. He competed in two events at the 1992 Summer Olympics.

References

1959 births
Living people
Brazilian male equestrians
Olympic equestrians of Brazil
Equestrians at the 1992 Summer Olympics
Sportspeople from Rio de Janeiro (city)